Michael Kohlmann (born 11 January 1974) is a retired professional tennis player from Germany. 

Primarily a doubles specialist, he has won five ATP Tour doubles titles in his career. In March 2007, he reached his career-high doubles ranking of World No. 27.

Kohlmann reached the third round of the 1998 US Open in singles and was part of the squad who reached the semifinals of the 2007 Davis Cup. Since 2015 he is the captain of the Germany Davis Cup Team.

Performance timelines

Singles

Doubles

Mixed doubles

ATP Career Finals

Doubles: 19 (5 titles, 14 runner-ups)

ATP Challenger and ITF Futures finals

Singles: 10 (5–5)

Doubles: 41 (23–18)

External links
 
 
 

1974 births
Living people
Sportspeople from Hagen
German male tennis players
Tennis people from North Rhine-Westphalia